Driller Park is a baseball park in Kilgore, Texas, USA, constructed in 1947 for the Kilgore Drillers and refurbished in 2008 for the East Texas Pump Jacks of the Texas Collegiate League. The park has also been used for East Texas college and high school baseball matches. The park has a capacity of 3,000.

Driller Park plaque
On April 24, 1947, the Drillers played their first game in front of a full house. A Texas Historical Commission plaque outside Driller Park states:

Kilgore Drillers
The Kilgore Drillers existed briefly for four seasons, playing the first two seasons in the Lone Star League and the last two in the East Texas League. The Drillers were successful in their years in the Lone Star League and the East Texas League.

The Kilgore Drillers folded after the 1950 season. They had played consistently winning baseball claiming two consecutive championships in the Lone Star League, were the runners-up in 1949, and had a respectable finish in 1950 before being disbanded. It was 58 years before Driller Park saw another team take residence.

1947 season
They finished the regular season at the top of the standings with a 78-60 record. In the playoffs, they swept the Tyler Trojans while the Marshall Comets beat the Longview Texans, 4-1. In the championship series, the Drillers defeated the Comets 4 games to 2 to become the 1947 Lone Star League champions.

1948 season
They finished the regular season at the top of the standings once again, with a 94-44 record. In the playoffs, they defeated the Henderson Oilers 4 games to 3 while the Longview Texans defeated the Tyler Trojans 4 games to 3 also. In the championship series, the Drillers beat the Texans to become Lone Star League champions again.

1949 season
In their first season in the East Texas League, the Drillers finished in 4th place with a record of 75-65. In the playoffs, they defeated the Longview Texans 4 games to 3; the Gladewater Bears defeated the Paris Panthers 4 games to 3 also. In the championship series, Kilgore finished as the runner-up to Gladewater being beaten in four games.

1950 season
The Drillers finished 3rd in 1950. In the playoffs, Kilgore was beaten by the Marshall Browns 4 games to one in the first round.

The return of summer collegiate baseball
In January 2008, it was announced that the Texas Collegiate League would add a team in Kilgore for the upcoming season. Fans were invited to make suggestions to the front office of the new club in the "Name Your Team" contest. In early April 2008, general manager Mike Lieberman announced the new team would be called the East Texas Pump Jacks, complete with dual logos representing East Texas' history in the oil industry. One logo is a donkey representing the pumping unit or horsehead pump, the over ground for a reciprocating piston installed in a borehole. It is used to mechanically lift liquid out of the well if there is not enough bottom hole pressure for the liquid to flow all the way to the surface. The other logo is a dinosaur, representing the fossil fuels used in oil drilling.

In their first season at Driller Park, the Pump Jacks finished third with a 22-26 record before being beaten by the Coppell Copperheads in the first round.

References

 Texas Collegiate League fan forum

Buildings and structures in Gregg County, Texas
Buildings and structures in Rusk County, Texas
Baseball venues in East Texas
Baseball venues in Texas